The Architecture Firm Award is the highest honor that  The American Institute of Architects can bestow on an architecture firm for consistently producing distinguished architecture.

Prior recipients of the AIA Architecture Firm Award include:
2021: Moody Nolan
2020: Architecture Research Office
2019: Payette
2018: Snow Kreilich Architects
2017: Leddy Maytum Stacy Architects
2016: LMN Architects
2015: Ehrlich Architects
2014: Eskew+Dumez+Ripple
2013: Tod Williams Billie Tsien Architects
2012: VJAA
2011: BNIM Architects
2010: Pugh + Scarpa
2009: Olson Sundberg Kundig Allen Architects
2008: KieranTimberlake Associates, LLP
2007:  Leers Weinzapfel Associates Architects, Inc.
2006:  Moore Ruble Yudell Architects and Planners
2005:  Murphy/Jahn
2004:  Lake Flato Architects
2003:  The Miller Hull Partnership 
2002:  Thompson, Ventulett, Stainback & Associates, Inc. 
2001:  Herbert Lewis Kruse Blunck Architecture 
2000:  Gensler
1999:  Perkins and Will
1998:  Centerbrook Architects & Planners
1997:  Kliment & Frances Halsband Architects
1996:  Skidmore, Owings & Merrill LLP 
1995:  Beyer Blinder Belle 
1994:  Bohlin Cywinski Jackson
1993:  Cambridge Seven Associates, Inc.
1992:  James Stewart Polshek and Partners 
1991:  Zimmer Gunsul Frasca Partnership
1990:  Kohn Pedersen Fox Associates 
1989:  César Pelli & Associates 
1988:  Hartman-Cox Architects 
1987:  Benjamin Thompson & Associates, Inc. 
1986:  Esherick Homsey Dodge & Davis 
1985:  Venturi, Rauch and Scott Brown 
1984:  Kallmann McKinnell & Wood Architects 
1983:  Holabird & Root 
1982:  Gwathmey Siegel & Associates, Architects LLC 
1981:  Hardy Holzman Pfeiffer Associates 
1980:  Edward Larrabee Barnes Associates 
1979:  Geddes Brecher Qualls Cunningham
1978:  Harry Weese & Associates 
1977:  Sert Jackson and Associates 
1976:  Mitchell/Giurgola Architects 
1975:  Davis, Brody & Associates
1974:  Kevin Roche John Dinkeloo and Associates 
1973:  Shepley Bulfinch Richardson and Abbott
1972:  Caudill Rowlett Scott 
1971:  Albert Kahn Associates, Inc. 
1970:  Ernest J. Kump Associates 
1969:  Jones & Emmons 
1968:  I.M. Pei & Partners 
1967:  Hugh Stubbins and Associates
1965:  Wurster, Bernardi & Emmons 
1964:  The Architects Collaborative 
1962:  Skidmore, Owings & Merrill

References

American architecture awards